The 2006–07 V-League season was the 3rd season of the V-League, the highest professional volleyball league in South Korea. The season started on 23 December 2006 and finished on 31 March 2007.

Cheonan Hyundai Capital Skywalkers were the defending champions in the men's league and Cheonan Heungkuk Pink Spiders the defending female champions.

Teams

Men's clubs

Women's clubs

Regular season

League table (Men's)

League table (Women's)

Final stage

Bracket (Men's)

Bracket (Women's)

Top Scorers

Men's

Women's

Player of the Round

Men's

Women's

Final standing

Men's League

Women's League

References

External links
 Official website 

2006 in volleyball
2007 in volleyball
V-League (South Korea)